Teófilo Manuel García Corpus (born 6 February 1958) is a Mexican politician affiliated with the Institutional Revolutionary Party. He served as Deputy of the LVII and LIX Legislatures of the Mexican Congress representing Oaxaca, as well as a local deputy in the LVIII Legislature of the Congress of Oaxaca.

References

1958 births
Living people
Politicians from Oaxaca
Members of the Congress of Oaxaca
Institutional Revolutionary Party politicians
20th-century Mexican politicians
21st-century Mexican politicians
Chapingo Autonomous University alumni
Benito Juárez Autonomous University of Oaxaca alumni
Deputies of the LIX Legislature of Mexico
Members of the Chamber of Deputies (Mexico) for Oaxaca